The Clawson point is a special point in a planar triangle defined by the trilinear coordinates  (Kimberling number X(19)), where  are the interior angles at the triangle vertices . It is named after John Wentworth Clawson, who published it 1925 in the American Mathematical Monthly.

Geometrical constructions 
There are at least two ways to construct the Clawson point, which also could be used as coordinate free definitions of the point. In both cases you have two triangles, where the three lines connecting their according vertices meet in a common point, which is the Clawson point.

Construction 1 
For a given triangle  let  be its orthic triangle and  the triangle formed by the outer tangents to its three excircles. These two triangles are similar and the Clawson point is their center of similarity, therefore the three lines  connecting their vertices meet in a common point, which is the Clawson point.

Construction 2

For a triangle  its circumcircle intersects each of its three excircles in two points. The three lines through those points of intersections form a triangle . This triangle and the triangle   are perspective triangles with the Clawson point being  their perspective center. Hence the three lines  meet in the Clawson point.

History 
The point is now named after J. W. Clawson, who published its trilinear coordinates 1925 in the American Mathematical Monthly as problem 3132, where he asked for geometrical construction of that point. However the French mathematician
Émile Lemoine had already examined the point in 1886. Later the point was independently rediscovered by R. Lyness and G. R. Veldkamp in 1983, who called it crucial point after the Canadian math journal Crux Mathematicorum in which it was published as problem 682.

References

External links 
 
 X(19)=CLAWSON POINT und CLAWSON POINT at the Encyclopedia of trinagle Centers (ETC)
 LE POINT CLAWSON PAR LES TRIANGLES ORTHIQUES ET EXTANGENT
 Clawson Point: Orthic Triangle, Extangents Triangle, Homothecy or Homothety

Triangle centers